High Visibility is an album released by the Swedish rock band The Hellacopters and the first studio album to feature the new guitarist Robert Dahlqvist. The album was released on both CD and vinyl; the first vinyl release featured the music on three sides and an etching of the band's logo on the fourth, the second was a 2×180g issue but without the etching. Both versions also contained the bonus track "No Dogs". There was also a limited edition from Gearhead Records on red vinyl without the bonus track. The Japanese version of the CD also features "A Cross for Cain" as a bonus track.

Track listing

Personnel 
The Hellacopters:
Nicke Andersson – Vocals, guitars, clavinet, percussion
Robert Dahlqvist – Guitars, vocals
Kenny Håkansson – Bass guitar
Anders Lindström – organ, piano
Robert Eriksson – Drums, backing vocals

Additional musicians:
Scott Morgan – Vocals
Biff Malibu – Vocals
Mattias Bärjed – Guitars
Fredrick Wennerlund – Percussion
Karin Thyr – Backing vocals
Charlotte Ollward – Backing vocals

Production:
 Chips Kiesbye – Producer
 Stefan Boman – Engineer
 George Marino – Mastering

References

External links 
 High Visibility – Our Favourite Album

2000 albums
The Hellacopters albums
Albums recorded at Polar Studios